The Boston Marathon, one of the six World Marathon Majors, is a  race which has been held in the Greater Boston area in Massachusetts since 1897. Until 2020, it was the oldest annual marathon in the world, a distinction now held by the Osaka-Lake Biwa Marathon, an elite men's race which has been held annually since 1946, and since 2022 is part of the Osaka Marathon (only the elite men's race is designated as Lake Biwa, the other races are designated as the Osaka Marathon). The event is held on Patriots' Day, which was April 19 (or April 20 if April 19 was a Sunday) until the implementation of the Uniform Monday Holiday Act in 1971.  Since 1971, except in 2020 (race not held) or 2021 (Columbus Day holiday), the Boston Marathon is held on the third Monday in April.  Various factors meant that until 1957 the course varied in length, due to which the marathon recognizes several course records that are slower than previous records due to being run on longer courses. The first Boston Marathon included only 15 runners, all of whom were men, and was won by John McDermott. The race was cancelled twice, in 1918 because of World War I, where a ekiden-style relay was conducted of military teams, and in 2020, when Massachusetts authorities refused to allow the event to be conducted due to the COVID-19 pandemic. The winners have represented 27 different countries: Americans have won the marathon the most, doing so on 108 occasions; Kenyans have won 34 times; and Canadians 21 times. Ernst van Dyk is the most successful individual athlete, having won the men's wheelchair division ten times. The current course records are held by Geoffrey Mutai, Buzunesh Deba, Marcel Hug and Manuela Schär.

Clarence DeMar won the men's open race seven times, more than any other runner, achieving his first victory in 1911 and his last in 1930. Women were only officially allowed to run the race beginning in 1972, though female runners had unofficially participated beginning in 1966 despite breaching the rules of the Amateur Athletic Union. The first six victories in the women's open division, between 1966 and 1971, were officially recognized in 1996. Bobbi Gibb was the first woman to finish the race in 1966, while Nina Kuscsik was the first official winner in 1972. Catherine Ndereba's four victories between 2000 and 2005 are the most in the women's open division. The Boston Marathon became the first major marathon to include a wheelchair division, in 1975, which was won by Robert Hall, though the first person to complete the race in a wheelchair had been Eugene Roberts in 1970. The first female wheelchair finisher, Sharon Rahn, came in 1977. Ernst van Dyk's ten wins in the men's wheelchair division are the most of any athlete at Boston, while Jean Driscoll leads the women's wheelchair division with seven wins, and holds the overall record for the most consecutive victories, also seven. A handcyclist division was recognized for the first time in 2017, though handcyclists had been taking part prior to that. Tom Davis has won all three men's handcyclist races since it was officially recognized, while the women's race has had a different winner each year.

The course was designed to replicate the original marathon in Greece; a hilly point-to-point race, and as such has not been the venue for many world records. Suh Yun-bok set the only World Athletics-ratified men's open division world record in 1947, in a time of 2:25:39. Two apparent world record times set between 1951 and 1956 by Keizo Yamada and Antti Viskari were later struck when the course was found to be over  short. In 1975, Liane Winter took advantage of a  following wind to set a world record in the women's open race of 2:42:24, and eight years later, Joan Benoit beat a world record that had only been set the day before at the London Marathon, finishing in 2:22:43. Since 1990, the Boston Marathon has been ineligible for world records, as the start and finish are too far away from each other, and the race is a net downhill. In 2011, Geoffrey Mutai won the race in 2:03:02, which was the world's fastest time for the marathon, beating the official world record by 57 seconds.

Winners

Key

Men's open division

Women's open division

Men's wheelchair division

Women's wheelchair division

Men's handcycle division

Women's handcycle division

Victories by nationality

Notes and references

Notes

Citations

 
Boston